Remzi Musaoğlu (born 25 January 1965) is a Turkish wrestler. He competed in the men's freestyle 57 kg at the 1992 Summer Olympics.

References

External links
 

1965 births
Living people
Turkish male sport wrestlers
Olympic wrestlers of Turkey
Wrestlers at the 1992 Summer Olympics
People from Kardzhali